Pocharam Wildlife Sanctuary is a forest and wildlife sanctuary located  from Medak and  from Hyderabad, Telangana, India. It is named after the Pocharam lake, formed from the bunding of the Allair from 1916-1922. The sanctuary has an ecotourism center for visitors. It is home to many species of birds and mammals. The sanctuary is situated 100 km from Nizamabad city.

References

External links

Nizamabad, Telangana
Medak district
Central Deccan Plateau dry deciduous forests
Wildlife sanctuaries of Telangana
1952 establishments in India
Protected areas established in 1952